Taylor & Adams was an engraving firm in Boston, Massachusetts, in the mid-19th century, established by James L. Taylor and Thomas W. Adams. The business operated from an office in Joy's Building on Washington Street in the 1850s and 1860s. Clients included the Boston Herald and publishers Lee & Shepard.

References

External links

 Mass. Historical Society. "Restoration of Dr. Parkman's Skeleton."  Engraving by Taylor & Adams, 1850. Published in: Trial of Professor John W. Webster, for the Murder of Dr. George Parkman (Boston: John A. French, 1850. Page 25)
 New York Historical Society. The Mansion of Happiness, 1864. 
 RootsWeb. Photos of James L. Taylor and his family

Image gallery

American engravers
19th century in Boston
Financial District, Boston